John William Sterling (May 12, 1844 – July 5, 1918) was a founding partner of Shearman & Sterling LLP and major benefactor to Yale University.

Early life and career
John William Sterling was born in Stratford, Connecticut, the son of Catherine Tomlinson (Plant) and John William Sterling. He graduated from Yale University with a B.A. in 1864 and was a member of Skull and Bones and president of Brothers in Unity during his senior year.  He graduated from Columbia Law School as the valedictorian of the class of 1867 and was admitted to the bar in that year. He obtained an M.A. degree in 1874. He became a corporate lawyer in New York City, and in 1871 helped found the law firm of Shearman & Sterling, which represented Jay Gould, Henry Ford, the Rockefeller family, and Standard Oil.

On his death in 1918, Sterling left a residuary estate of $15 million to Yale, at the time the "largest sum of money ever donated to an institution of higher learning in history"—equivalent to about $200 million in 2011 dollars.  After the estate appraisal was complete a year later, the Yale bequest was "about $18 million."  He required Yale to fund "at least one enduring, useful and architecturally beautiful building, which will constitute a fitting Memorial of my gratitude to and affection for my alma mater" and "the foundation of Scholarships, Fellowships or Lectureships, the endowment of new professorships and the establishment of special funds for prizes"—these mandates led to the construction of the Sterling Memorial Library, Sterling Law Building, the Hall of Graduate Studies, and the Sterling Hall of Medicine, and the endowment of the Sterling Professorships.

Personal life
Sterling never married. In 2003, historian Jonathan Ned Katz uncovered evidence that Sterling lived for nearly fifty years in a same-sex intimate partnership with cotton broker James O. Bloss.

Death
Sterling died July 5, 1918, while staying at the fishing lodge of Lord Mount Stephen in Grand-Métis, Quebec; he is entombed at Woodlawn Cemetery.

Sterling's sister Cordelia donated the Sterling House and its surrounding estate—part of the Sterling Homestead—to Stratford, Connecticut.

References

External links
 John William Sterling and James Orville Bloss from outhistory.org

New York (state) lawyers
Yale University alumni
Columbia Law School alumni
1844 births
1918 deaths
Benefactors of Yale University
People associated with Shearman & Sterling
19th-century American lawyers
19th-century American philanthropists